"Oh My God" is the debut single of English indie rock band Kaiser Chiefs. It was initially released by the Drowned in Sound label on 17 May 2004, reaching number 66 on the UK Singles Chart. It was re-released on 21 February 2005, two weeks before the release of their debut album, Employment. This time, it peaked at number six on the UK Singles Chart, which earned the band their first top-10 hit as well as their highest-charting single at the time until it was succeeded by UK chart-topper "Ruby" on 25 February 2007. The song also appeared on the soundtrack for the video game Driver: Parallel Lines.

The original single release, now a rarity due to its limited run of 500 copies, features artwork by frontman Ricky Wilson, and its B-sides were earlier versions of "Born to Be a Dancer" and "Caroline, Yes", both of which would also appear on Employment.

Background
Singer Ricky Wilson said, "The verses are about the fact that we've been playing together for such a long time and people think, 'What's he doing? He's still trying to make a career out of music? It'll never work. One in a million people do it.' But we still had the opinion that we were five of the people in a million, so we carried on."

Dorian Lynskey of The Guardian wrote that the Kaiser Chiefs had been labeled as has-beens by 2003-2004, and they were desperate to build a fanbase to impress record labels: "The need to make an impression while bottom of the bill in a tiny venue explains all the ohhhhhhs and nanananas and oft-repeated choruses that set up shop in the listener's brain after the first listen."

Track listing

Initial release
All of these tracks are different, earlier versions of the album editions.
 "Oh My God"
 "Born to Be a Dancer"
 "Caroline, Yes"

Re-issue
7-inch (limited-edition white vinyl)
 "Oh My God"
 "Brightest Star"

CD
 "Oh My God"
 "Think About You (And I Like It)"

Mexican CD
 "Oh My God"
 "Hard Times Send Me"
 "Born to Be a Dancer" (demo)
 "Oh My God" (enhanced video)

Charts

Weekly charts

Year-end charts

Certifications

Release history

Mark Ronson version

In 2006, "Oh My God" was covered by Lily Allen on her second mixtape. She later re-recorded the track with Mark Ronson for his second studio album, Version (2007). This version was released as the second single from the album on 16 July 2007. The single was a success, reaching number eight on the UK Singles Chart.

Music video
The music video was directed by Nima Nourizadeh, and features a cartoon version of Allen (a reference to Jessica Rabbit in the film Who Framed Roger Rabbit) performing the song and flirting in the Ink and Paint Club. The Kaiser Chiefs themselves make a cameo. Of notice is that, in the video, "Lily Allen" is the only toon present. Most of the toons that worked at the club (the octopus bartender, the penguin waiters, Bongo the Gorilla and Betty Boop) have been replaced by real people.

Live performances
When Ronson performed at the BBC Electric Proms in 2007, Allen had been the intended singer of the song but cancelled at the last minute. Rather than not perform the song, Ricky Wilson, who was performing with the Kaiser Chiefs the next day, stepped in. Ronson and Wilson performed the song again on the last Friday Night with Jonathan Ross of 2007, which also featured Candie Payne. Daniel Merriweather, who appears on Ronson's debut single "Stop Me" (and appears in the accompanying video), also has a cameo in this video.

Track listings
UK CD single
 "Oh My God" (radio edit)
 "Oh My God" (the clean Super Busdown remix)
 "Oh My God" (instrumental)
 "Pistol of Fire"

10-inch vinyl
 "Oh My God" (radio edit)
 "Oh My God" (the dirty Super Busdown remix)

European CD single
 "Oh My God" (radio edit)
 "Oh My God" (instrumental)
 "Oh My God" (Christopher Lake mix)
 "Oh My God" (Emperor Machine extended vocal mix)
 "Oh My God" (the clean Super Busdown remix)
 "Oh My God" (the dirty Super Busdown remix)

Digital download
 "Oh My God" (radio edit)
 "Oh My God" (instrumental)
 "Oh My God" (the clean Super Busdown remix)
 "Oh My God" (the dirty Super Busdown remix)
 "Oh My God" (Christopher Lake mix)
 "Oh My God" (Emperor Machine ext vocal mix)
 "Pistol of Fire"

Charts

Weekly charts

Year-end charts

Release history

2020 reworked edit
The band, influenced by the current coronavirus pandemic, unveiled a reworked "Stay Home" edition with new, lockdown-inspired lyrics. The idea came about as a joke, when a fan of The Chris Moyles Show on Radio X texted in to suggest alternative lyrics, prompting Chris to message Ricky with the idea. Ricky then rewrote the song, notably changing the chorus from "Oh my God I can't believe it, I've never been this far away from home" to "Oh my god I can't believe it, I've never spent this much time at home" and re-recorded it from home, on call with the other band members. It also mentions the Clap for our Carers appreciation gesture. The song was posted on Twitter and uploaded to YouTube on 14 April.

References

2004 songs
2004 debut singles
2005 singles
2007 singles
B-Unique Records singles
Columbia Records singles
Kaiser Chiefs songs
Lily Allen songs
Mark Ronson songs
Song recordings produced by Mark Ronson
Song recordings produced by Stephen Street
Songs written by Ricky Wilson (British musician)
Songs written by Andrew White (musician)
Songs written by Simon Rix
Songs written by Nick Hodgson
Songs written by Nick "Peanut" Baines
UK Independent Singles Chart number-one singles
Universal Records singles